Krylovsky District is an administrative district (raion), one of the thirty-eight in Krasnodar Krai, Russia. As a municipal division, it is incorporated as Krylovsky Municipal District. It is located in the northeast of the krai. Its administrative center is the rural locality (a stanitsa) of Krylovskaya. Population:  The population of Krylovskaya accounts for 37.9% of the district's total population.

References

Notes

Sources

Districts of Krasnodar Krai